Archibald C. Meiklem was a Scottish amateur footballer who played as an outside right in the Scottish League for Queen's Park.

Career statistics

References 

Scottish footballers
British Army personnel of World War I
Queen's Park F.C. players
Year of death missing
Scottish Football League players
Place of birth missing
Footballers from Glasgow
Association football outside forwards
1889 births